The 1964 United States Senate election in New Mexico took place on November 3, 1964. Incumbent Republican U.S. Senator Edwin L. Mechem sought re-election to a full term, but was defeated by Democrat Joseph Montoya.

General election

Results

See also 
 1964 United States Senate elections

References

External links

New Mexico
1964
1964 New Mexico elections